Tiny Hoekstra (born 15 September 1996) is a Dutch women's footballer, who plays for Ajax. She previously played for Heerenveen between 2012 and 2021, and was the top scorer in the 2018–19 Eredivisie. Hoekstra has played for the Netherlands under-17, under-19 and under-21 teams.

Club career
Hoekstra made her senior club debut for Heerenveen in the 2012–13 BeNe League, and scored on her home debut against FC Utrecht. In October 2018 Hoekstra was prevented from doing a post-match interview in Frisian, and told that all interviews must be done in Dutch. In April 2019, she scored six goals in a match against Achilles '29; Heerenveen won the match 12–0. She was the top scorer in the 2018–19 Eredivisie with 27 goals. In May 2020, she signed a one-year contract extension with Heerenveen. In October 2020, she was critical of the Royal Dutch Football Association (KNVB) for suspending the 2020–21 Eredivisie for a month due to the COVID-19 pandemic. She made 12 appearances in the 2020–21 Eredivisie, scoring two goals. One of the goals was against Ajax.

In May 2021, Hoekstra announced a move to Ajax on a one-year contract, for the 2021–22 Eredivisie. She scored in the final of the Eredivisie Cup, as Ajax lost 4–3 to FC Twente.

International career
Hoekstra has played for the Netherlands under-17 and under-19 teams. She scored for Netherlands under-19s in a 2015 UEFA Women's Under-19 Championship qualification match against Slovenia. Hoekstra has not been selected for the Dutch senior team.

Personal life
Hoekstra is from Rinsumageest, Friesland, Netherlands.

References

External links

1996 births
Living people
Dutch women's footballers
Eredivisie (women) players
SC Heerenveen (women) players
AFC Ajax (women) players
Frisian women
Women's association football forwards
20th-century Dutch women
21st-century Dutch women